North Carolina's 35th Senate district is one of 50 districts in the North Carolina Senate. It has been represented by Republican Todd Johnson since 2019.

Geography
Since 2023, the district has covered parts of Union and Cabarrus counties. The district overlaps with the 55th, 68th, 69th and 83rd state house districts.

District officeholders

Election results

2022

2020

2018

2016

2014

2012

2010

2008

2006

2004

2002

2000

References

North Carolina Senate districts
Union County, North Carolina
Cabarrus County, North Carolina